Sârbeni is a commune in Teleorman County, Muntenia, Romania. It is composed of three villages: Sârbeni, Sârbenii de Jos and Udeni.

References

Communes in Teleorman County
Localities in Muntenia